Duchess Marie Louise of Mecklenburg-Schwerin (31 March 180326 October 1862) was daughter of Frederick Louis, Hereditary Grand Duke of Mecklenburg-Schwerin and consort of Georg, Duke of Saxe-Altenburg.

Early life
Marie Louise was born at Ludwigslust, Mecklenburg-Schwerin, second child and first daughter of Frederick Louis, Hereditary Grand Duke of Mecklenburg-Schwerin (1778–1819), (son of Frederick Francis I, Grand Duke of Mecklenburg-Schwerin and Princess Louise of Saxe-Gotha-Altenburg) and his wife, Grand Duchess Elena Pavlovna of Russia (1784–1803), (daughter of Paul I of Russia and Duchess Sophie Dorothea of Württemberg).

Marriage
Marie Louise married 7 October 1825 at Ludwigslust to Georg, Duke of Saxe-Altenburg (1796–1853), son of Frederick, Duke of Saxe-Altenburg, and his wife, Duchess Charlotte Georgine of Mecklenburg-Strelitz.

They had three children:
 Ernst I, Duke of Saxe-Altenburg (b. Hildburghausen, 16 September 1826 – d. Altenburg, 7 February 1908); married Princess Agnes of Anhalt-Dessau.
 Prince Albrecht Frederick August (b. Hildburghausen, 31 October 1827 – d. Ludwigslust, 28 May 1835).
 Prince Moritz of Saxe-Altenburg (b. Eisenberg, 24 October 1829 – d. Arco, Italy, 13 May 1907); married Princess Augusta of Saxe-Meiningen.

Ancestry

Bibliography
The Royal House of Stuart, London, 1969, 1971, 1976, Addington, A. C., Reference:
Het Groothertogelijk Huis Mecklenburg, Bergen-op-Zoom, 1901–1902, Juten, W. J. F., Reference: page 112

|-
 

 

1803 births
1862 deaths
House of Mecklenburg
House of Mecklenburg-Schwerin
Duchesses of Mecklenburg-Schwerin
House of Saxe-Altenburg
People from Ludwigslust